Hodovo is a village in the municipalities of Berkovići, Republika Srpska, and Stolac, Bosnia and Herzegovina.

Demographics 
According to the 2013 census, its population was 8 Bosniaks in the Berkovići part and 377 people in the Stolac part.

References

Populated places in Berkovići
Populated places in Stolac
Villages in the Federation of Bosnia and Herzegovina